Shayne McCosh (born January 27, 1974) is a Canadian retired professional ice hockey defenceman. Between 1994 and 2005 he has played in the American Hockey League (AHL) and the ECHL in North America as well as the British Ice Hockey Superleague (ISL), the Italian Serie A, the German Deutsche Eishockey Liga (DEL) and the Austrian Nationalliga (Austria-2).

Playing career
McCosh was born in Oshawa, Ontario. He played junior ice hockey for the Kitchener Rangers, Windsor Spitfires and Detroit Junior Red Wings between 1990 and 1995. During that time he helped the Red Wings to win their division in the 1993–94 and 1994–95 seasons. He was also a member of the Red Wings' J. Ross Robertson Cup winning team in 1994–95.

McCosh made his senior level debut with the Springfield Falcons in the AHL in 1994–95. The following season, he played for the Erie Panthers in the ECHL and the Providence Bruins in the AHL.

In 1996–97 McCosh joined the Bracknell Bees in the British ISL. He stayed with Bracknell for three seasons before joining the Sheffield Steelers, also of the ISL. He played with Sheffield for two seasons, during which time he helped them to win the Challenge Cup in 1999–00 and a Grand Slam of all available trophies in 2000–01.

In 2001–02 McCosh joined HC Bolzano in the Italian Serie A before joining Augsburger Panther in the DEL for the 2002–03 season. He returned to Bolzano the following season before playing for EK Zell am See in the Austrian second tier Nationalliga in 2004–05 and then retiring from the professional game.

Awards and honours
Named to the ISL All-Star Second Team in 1997–98 and 1999–00.
Named to the ISL All-Star First Team in 2000–01.
Named the Sekonda Face to Watch in March 1999 and January 2001.

Career statistics

References

External links

1974 births
Augsburger Panther players
Bolzano HC players
Bracknell Bees players
Canadian ice hockey defencemen
Detroit Junior Red Wings players
Erie Panthers players
Ice hockey people from Ontario
Kitchener Rangers players
Living people
Sportspeople from Oshawa
Providence Bruins players
Sheffield Steelers players
Springfield Falcons players
Canadian expatriate ice hockey players in England
Canadian expatriate ice hockey players in Italy
Canadian expatriate ice hockey players in Germany